Women's boxing was contested at the 2009 Asian Indoor Games in Hanoi, Vietnam from 30 October to 4 November.  The competition took place at the Bắc Ninh Gymnasium.

Medalists

Medal table

Results

46 kg

48 kg

51 kg

54 kg

57 kg

60 kg

64 kg

69 kg

References
 Official site

2009 Asian Indoor Games events
Asian Indoor Games